Larry Stanley (19 May 1896 – 21 September 1987) was an Irish Gaelic footballer who played at senior level for the Kildare and Dublin county teams.

Regarded as one of the greatest players of his generation, Stanley made his first appearance on the inter-county scene during the 1916 championship and was a regular member of the starting fifteen for both Kildare and Dublin until his retirement after the 1930 championship. During that time he won two All-Ireland medals and three Leinster medals. Stanley captained Kildare to the All-Ireland title in 1919.

At club level Stanley enjoyed a hugely successful career with Caragh, winning two county club championship. He also played with O'Tooles and the Garda club in Dublin.

Stanley was also a successful high jumper and represented Ireland at the 1924 Summer Olympics.

In retirement from sport Stanley came to be recognised as one of the greats of Gaelic football. In 1980 he was the inaugural recipient of the All-Time All Star Award. He was posthumously included on a special selection of the greatest Garda football team ever.

References

 

1896 births
1987 deaths
All-Ireland-winning captains (football)
Athletes (track and field) at the 1924 Summer Olympics
Caragh Gaelic footballers
Dublin inter-county Gaelic footballers
Gaelic football goalkeepers
Garda Gaelic footballers
Garda Síochána officers
Irish male high jumpers
Kildare inter-county Gaelic footballers
Olympic athletes of Ireland
Winners of two All-Ireland medals (Gaelic football)